Andrea Verónica Ávila (born April 4, 1970, in Villa Carlos Paz) is a retired long and triple jumper from Argentina.

Ávila won two medals at the 1995 Pan American Games in Mar del Plata, Argentina. She competed in two consecutive Summer Olympics for her native country, starting in 1996.

International competitions

References

External links
 

1970 births
Living people
Sportspeople from Córdoba Province, Argentina
Argentine female long jumpers
Argentine female triple jumpers
Olympic athletes of Argentina
Athletes (track and field) at the 1996 Summer Olympics
Athletes (track and field) at the 2000 Summer Olympics
Pan American Games medalists in athletics (track and field)
Athletes (track and field) at the 1991 Pan American Games
Athletes (track and field) at the 1995 Pan American Games
Athletes (track and field) at the 1999 Pan American Games
World Athletics Championships athletes for Argentina
Pan American Games silver medalists for Argentina
Pan American Games bronze medalists for Argentina
South American Games gold medalists for Argentina
South American Games silver medalists for Argentina
South American Games medalists in athletics
Competitors at the 1990 South American Games
Competitors at the 1994 South American Games
Competitors at the 1998 South American Games
Medalists at the 1995 Pan American Games